Phillip David Lewis (born February 14, 1968) is an American actor, comedian and director who is best known for his role as hotel manager Mr. Moseby on the Disney Channel series The Suite Life of Zack & Cody and its spin-off, The Suite Life on Deck.

Lewis has also appeared in series such as Lizzie McGuire, Friends, The Wayans Bros., Yes, Dear, Scrubs and How I Met Your Mother.

Early life
Lewis was born on February 14, 1968, in Uganda to American parents. His father, Delano Lewis, served as the U.S. Peace Corps' associate director and country director for Nigeria and Uganda at the time and would later serve as the United States Ambassador to South Africa. Lewis has three brothers.

Career

Lewis made his film debut as Dennis in the 1988 dark comedy Heathers.  In 1991, he was cast in the lead role of the short-lived CBS sitcom Teech. The series was cancelled after thirteen episodes. He has appeared in smaller roles in other films, including City Slickers (1991), Bowfinger (1999), I Spy (2002), Surviving Christmas (2004), Kicking & Screaming (2005), and Beverly Hills Chihuahua 2 (2011). He also appeared in guest parts on various television series including Sister Sister, Pacific Blue, JAG, Ally McBeal, Joan of Arcadia, Brothers & Sisters, 8 Simple Rules, Buffy the Vampire Slayer, Friends and How I Met Your Mother. Lewis has also had recurring roles on A Different World, The Wayans Bros., Lizzie McGuire, Yes, Dear, Scrubs, and Raising Hope.

Lewis co-starred in the Disney Channel original series The Suite Life of Zack & Cody as Mr. Moseby. In 2008, he had reprised the role on a spin-off The Suite Life on Deck, where he plays the manager of The S.S. Tipton. He has appeared as a guest star on Disney Channel's That's So Raven and Phineas and Ferb and also in one of the channel's original films, Dadnapped. On the children's series Special Agent Oso, he has a recurring role as the voice of Agent Wolfie.

As a television director, he directed eight episodes of The Suite Life on Deck, first making his directorial debut with The Suite Life of Zack & Cody episode "I Want My Mummy" (2007). He has since gone on to direct episodes of the Disney Channel sitcoms A.N.T. Farm, Austin & Ally, Good Luck Charlie, Kickin' It and Jessie. His other television directing credits include Malibu Country, Mike & Molly, 2 Broke Girls, The Soul Man, Sullivan & Son, Melissa & Joey, Young & Hungry, The Odd Couple, One Day at a Time, and Indebted. He also directed the live episode of Undateable in 2015 that secured a third season for the series.

From 2017 to 2019, Lewis directed fifteen episodes of Netflix sitcom One Day at a Time.

Personal life
In late December 1991, Lewis was arrested after he fatally struck  Isabel Duarte, a resident of Bethesda, Maryland, in a car crash. He was charged with manslaughter and driving while intoxicated. His blood alcohol level at the time measured three times the limit for legal intoxication. The court sentenced Lewis to five years in prison, but suspended four, citing Lewis's work after his arrest with a prison-based theater troupe that performed in jails, schools, and churches, to highlight the consequences of drug abuse. Lewis was also ordered to serve two years' probation after his release and to perform 350 hours of community service.

Lewis is married to Megan Benton Lewis and has two daughters.

Filmography

Film

Television

Director

References

External links
 

1968 births
African-American male comedians
African-American male actors
African-American television directors
American television directors
American male comedians
American male film actors
American people convicted of manslaughter
American male television actors
20th-century American male actors
American male voice actors
Living people
21st-century American male actors
20th-century American comedians
21st-century American comedians
20th-century African-American people
21st-century African-American people
African-American Catholics